David Lee Smith (born September 8, 1963) is an American actor, known for his role as John Oldman, the protagonist of the 2007 science fiction film, The Man from Earth and its 2017 sequel, The Man from Earth: Holocene; he co-starred with John Billingsley and Tony Todd. He has also appeared in other movies, including Fight Club, and dozens of television episodes, some as a recurring character such as IAB Sergeant Rick Stetler in CSI: Miami.

Biography
Smith was born in Birmingham, Alabama, and attended Banks High School. He graduated from the University of Alabama and Southern Methodist University.

Filmography
1993: All My Children – John Youngblood
1996: Savannah – Vincent Massick
1997: Star Trek: Voyager (TV series, "Darkling") – Zahir
1997: The Naked Truth (TV series) – Mark
1998: Just Shoot Me! (TV Series, "In the Company of Maya") – Steve McPherson
1998: JAG – Lt. Cmdr. 'Karma' Rice
1999: Fight Club – Walter
2001:  JAG – Maj. Miles Holmes
2002: A Walk To Remember – Dr. Carter (father of the protagonist Landon Carter)
2002: Divine Secrets of the Ya-Ya Sisterhood – Younger Shep Walke
2003-2010: CSI: Miami (TV series, Seasons 2-8) – IAB Sergeant Rick Stetler
2004: Mysterious Skin – Alfred
2007: Zodiac – Father of the witnesses
2007: The Man from Earth – John Oldman 
2009: Mending Fences (TV movie) – Walt Mitchell
2009: Dollhouse (TV series, "A Love Supreme") – Clay Corman
2010: Janie Jones – Officer Dickerson
2013: Crimson Winter – King Aldric
2017: The Man from Earth: Holocene – John Young, aka John Oldman
2018: Between Worlds – Kirby
2019: A Walk With Grace – Nate

References

External links
 

1963 births
American male actors
Living people
People from Birmingham, Alabama